Dipnelix is a genus of air-breathing land snail, a terrestrial gastropod mollusk in the family Charopidae.

Species
The genus Dipnelix includes the following species:
 Dipnelix pertricosa

References 

 
Charopidae
Taxonomy articles created by Polbot